Ilmari Johannes Salomies, previously Salonen (17 July 1893 – 26 December 1973, Helsinki), was the Archbishop of Turku, and the spiritual head of the Evangelical Lutheran Church of Finland between 1951 and 1964.

Biography
Salomies was born on July 17, 1893, in Mikkeli, the son of Edvard Salonen and Hedvig Sofia Salonen. 

From 1931 he taught church history at the University of Helsinki. In 1938 he became a full professor of ecclesiastical history. He was elected Bishop of Viipuri in February 1943 and consecrated on June 13 by Archbishop Erkki Kaila of Turku and Bishop Yrjö Wallinmaa of Oulu in Turku Cathedral. In 1945 the diocese's seat was transferred to Mikkeli and the name of the diocese was changed to the Diocese of Mikkeli, with Salomies as the first bishop with that title. In 1951 he was elected Archbishop of Turku where he remained till 1964. He died on December 26, 1973, in Helsinki and was buried in the Hietaniemi Cemetery in Helsinki.

References

External links
Archbishops of Turku: Ilmari Salomies 

1893 births
1973 deaths
People from Mikkeli
People from Mikkeli Province (Grand Duchy of Finland)
Lutheran archbishops and bishops of Turku
Academic staff of the University of Helsinki
20th-century Lutheran archbishops
Burials at Hietaniemi Cemetery